Olha Ivankova (born 7 January 1973) is a Ukrainian javelin thrower. She finished tenth at the 2007 World Championships. She also competed at the 2005 World Championships and the 2008 Olympic Games without reaching the final.

Achievements

References
 

1973 births
Living people
Ukrainian female javelin throwers
Athletes (track and field) at the 2008 Summer Olympics
Olympic athletes of Ukraine
World Athletics Championships athletes for Ukraine
21st-century Ukrainian women